Alexandra North is a subzone within the planning area of Bukit Merah, Singapore, as defined by the Urban Redevelopment Authority (URA). Its boundary is made up of the Alexandra Canal and Prince Charles Square in the north; Tanglin Road in the west; Alexandra Road in the south; and Delta Road in the east.

References

Bukit Merah
Central Region, Singapore